= Rattigeri =

Coordinates: 15°05′N 75°21′E

- Village
- Interactive map of Rattigeri
- Country: India
- State: Karnataka
- District: Dharwad

Government
  - Body: Village Panchayat

Population (2011)
  - Total: 1,195

Languages
  - Official: Kannada
- Time zone: UTC+5:30 (IST)
- ISO 3166 code: IN-KA
- Vehicle registration: KA
- Website: karnataka.gov.in

Rattigeri is a village in Dharwad district of Karnataka, India.

== Demographics ==
As of the 2011 Census of India there were 247 households in Rattigeri and a total population of 1,195 consisting of 607 males and 588 females. There were 171 children ages 0–6.
